Jamil Baz is a Lebanese-born financial economist based in Newport Beach, California.

Early life 
Baz was born in 1959 into a Christian Lebanese family. He was schooled at a Jesuit college, Notre Dame de Jamhour, in Lebanon. He pursued his studies in France, the UK and the US. He earned a Diploma from the Ecole des Hautes Etudes Commerciales, an M.Sc. from the London School of Economics, a Master's degree from the Massachusetts Institute of Technology Sloan School of Management and an MA and a Ph.D. from Harvard University.

Career 
Baz is a managing director at PIMCO. Prior to PIMCO, he was a senior managing director and chief investment strategist of the Man Group, a managing director in the Proprietary Trading Group of Goldman Sachs, chief investment strategist of Deutsche Bank and  managing director of Lehman Brothers. Baz started his career at the World bank where he traded the derivatives portfolio and advised Central Banks on the management of foreign exchange reserves and external debt. He teaches financial economics at Oxford University, and is on the teaching staff of the Mathematical Institute, University of Oxford; he has also taught at Georgetown University and Harvard University.

Personal life 
He is married to Zeina Farhat and has three children: Maurice, Elena and Alexandra.

References
https://www.amazon.com/Financial-Derivatives-Pricing-Applications-Mathematics/dp/0521066794
https://www.maths.ox.ac.uk/members/students/postgraduate-courses/msc-mathematical-finance-part-time/information-applicants-pa-0
https://www.reuters.com/article/allianz-moves-idUSL3N1634LV
https://www.pimco.com/experts/jamil-baz
https://www.ft.com/content/418ceb14-c45d-11e1-9c1e-00144feabdc0
https://www.ft.com/content/580fa460-8e8d-11df-964e-00144feab49a
https://www.ft.com/content/71b38230-da3e-11e5-a72f-1e7744c66818
https://www.bloomberg.com/news/articles/2016-08-30/pimco-s-baz-says-japan-in-a-bind-as-total-debt-tops-600-of-gdp
List of quantitative analysts

Year of birth missing (living people)
Living people
Alumni of the London School of Economics
MIT Sloan School of Management alumni
Harvard University alumni
Financial economists